Domien Loubry (born 3 March 1985) is a Belgian professional basketball player for Kangoeroes Mechelen of the BNXT League. Loubry plays as point guard.

Professional career
On 3 March 2020, Loubry signed with Kangoeroes Mechelen for the 2020–21 season. In his first season with Mechelen, he averaged 11.7 points and 4.7 assists per game, while also leading his team to the final of the Belgian Basketball Cup for the first time.

National team career
In 2013, Loubry joined Brussels which was just promoted to the first level Pro Basketball League. He stayed with Brussels for six seasons, helping the team become the runners-up of the PBL in 2017.

In 2008, Loubry was selected for the preliminary squad of the Belgium national basketball team by head coach Eddy Casteels. A year later, in 2009, he played his first international game.

Honours
Individual
Pro Basketball League assists leader: 2013–14

References

External links
 

1985 births
Living people
Antwerp Giants players
Basketball players at the 2015 European Games
Belgian men's basketball players
Brussels Basketball players
Dutch Basketball League players
European Games competitors for Belgium
Gent Hawks players
Kangoeroes Basket Mechelen players
Point guards
Sportspeople from Antwerp
West-Brabant Giants players